Aidy is a given name. Notable people with this name include:

 Aidy Bryant (born 1987), American actress and comedian
 Aidy Boothroyd (born 1971), English footballer and manager
 Aidy Mann (born 1967), English footballer and coach
 Aidy Mariappa (born 1986), English footballer
 Aidy White (born 1991), English-born Irish footballer

See also 
 Aidi (disambiguation)